Toprzyny  is a village in the administrative district of Gmina Górowo Iławeckie, within Bartoszyce County, Warmian-Masurian Voivodeship, in northern Poland, close to the border with the Kaliningrad Oblast of Russia.

Population 

1820:120
1846:155
1871:313
1895:217
1930:490
1939:439

References

Toprzyny